Highway 300 (AR 300, Ark. 300 and Hwy. 300) is a designation for two state highway segments in Central Arkansas. The main route of  runs from Highway 9/Highway 10 east to Cantrell Road and Chenal Parkway in Little Rock.

Route description

Perryville to Little Rock
The main route begins at Highway 9/Highway 10 south of Perryville and runs east along the northern edge of the Harris Brake Wildlife Management Area. After a brief quasi-concurrency south with Highway 113 where it climbs Wye Mountain, the route becomes very rural. Highway 300 skirts Lake Maumelle, the Ouachita National Recreation Trail, the Arkansas River, and Pinnacle Mountain State Park crossing both the Big and Little Maumelle Rivers (as well as the Pegasus Pipeline) while serving many unincorporated communities including Wye, Little Italy, Monnie Springs, Roland, Natural Steps, and Pinnacle before terminating at Cantrell Road in Little Rock near the base of Shinall Mountain. Immediately prior to this terminus, Highway 300 intersects Chenal Parkway, a mostly divided four-lane thoroughfare, which connects the route to Little Rock's Financial Centre District.

Arkansas River Trail
Between its northern quasi-concurrent split with Highway 113 at the base of Wye Mountain and its intersection with Roland Cutoff Road near Lundsford Corner, Highway 300 is designated as part of the Arkansas River Trail. Highway 300 reacquires this designation at its intersection with Henry Street in Roland and carries it south until it intersects Pinnacle Valley Road at Pinnacle Mountain State Park.

Big Maumelle River Truss Bridge

In the 1920s, a one-lane truss bridge was built on Highway 300 to cross the Big Maumelle River. The bridge still stands in the shadow of Pinnacle Mountain, but was made obsolete by a new bridge in 1981. Today, it is only open to pedestrians for fishing and hiking. It is part of the Ouachita National Recreation Trail and is visible from the current bridge.

Colonel Glenn Road

The second segment of Highway 300 begins at Interstate 430 and runs east as Colonel Glenn Road. The route runs to U.S. Highway 70 (US 70), which maintains the Colonel Glenn Road designation north and is named Stagecoach Road to the south. Highway 300 had an Average daily traffic (ADT) of 15000 vehicles in 2010 near its eastern terminus.

Major intersections

|-
| align=center colspan=4 | Highway 300 ends at AR 10 near Chenal Parkway
|-

|-
| align=center colspan=4 | Highway 300 begins at I-430
|-

Former Ledwidge spur

In Little Italy, Highway 300 Spur followed Ross Hollow Road eastward to its intersection with Ledwedge Road. The spur then continued north along Ledwedge Road toward the community of Ledwidge near the Little Rock and Western Railway and the Arkansas River. Servicing Ledwidge was likely the original purpose of this branch of Highway 300.

See also

 List of state highways in Arkansas

Notes and References

External links

300
Transportation in Pulaski County, Arkansas
Transportation in Perry County, Arkansas
Transportation in Little Rock, Arkansas